Samtgemeinde Dörpen is a Samtgemeinde in the district Emsland in Lower Saxony, Germany.

Following towns are situated in Dörpen:

(Population 2005)

References 

Samtgemeinden in Lower Saxony